The Ensoniq ASR-10 was a sampling keyboard produced by Ensoniq between 1992 and 1998. The ASR-10 was a follow up product to the very popular Ensoniq EPS and Ensoniq EPS-16+ performance samplers, and was also available with a piano style weighted keyboard (ASR-88) and a rackmount version (ASR-10R). At the time, the machine was one of the most powerful samplers available.

Features 
The ASR-10 (Advanced Sampling Recorder) was essentially the third generation of the EPS series of samplers, sharing the same basic architecture and user interface  as the earlier EPS and EPS-16 Plus.  The ASR-10, like its predecessors, was a true performance orientated sampling workstation, and did not require a computer or additional equipment in order to create a complete song. It included a powerful and flexible effects unit, polyphonic aftertouch, an advanced MIDI sequencer, load-while-playing abilities, and a powerful multi-layered synthesis engine. The supplied "Musician's Manual"  lived up to Ensoniq's documentation practice, with a highly readable, very hands-on and quite complete description of the device. There was even an included tutorial that covered many features of the machine, including sampling and sequencing.

Effects unit 

The ASR-10 offered a powerful and flexible internal effects unit (later offered as a standalone device in the Ensoniq DP/4), offering the capability to resample an existing sound with an effect, and to process external signals through it live. Up to 62 effects were available to be used, also including a vocoder and distortion. The effects were all programmable, and flexible configurations were available for operating in multitimbral or performance modes.

Sequencer 
The ASR-10 sequencer had an internal 96 pulse-per-quarter-note 16 track sequencer. A 'song' was a collection of 'sequences' joined together, and users were able to jump to sequences live during a performance, in much the same way as software such as Ableton Live allows today. Songs were constructed in either a step time (note by note basis) or through live recording of the MIDI information played in.

Synthesis architecture 
The ASR-10 had a powerful 31 voice synthesis architecture that resembled a synthesizer rather than a sampler. After selecting a sample, the sound could further be modified by up to 3 envelopes (hardwired to pitch, filter, and amplitude), 2 filters in series, one LFO, and 15 modulation sources. Up to 8 layers of different samples could be stacked together to form an 'instrument', and up to 127 different samples available up at any one time. Each sample could be modulated by any number of modulation sources, including velocity, polyphonic aftertouch, LFOs, envelopes, footpedals, or combinations of the two patch-select buttons on the left hand side of the keyboard. These patch-select buttons (an Ensoniq trademark) allowed the player to instantly recall during performance any one of four pre-programmed combinations of the eight layers to be sounded.

Sampling 
In its default format, the ASR-10 shipped with 2MB of internal memory. This was expandable to 16MB. The machine featured Sigma-Delta 64 times oversampling, and sampled at either 30 kHz or 44.1 kHz rates at 16 bit.

The machine also has the ability to record directly to hard disk with only disk space limiting the file size. This allowed it to function as an early digital two track hard disk recorder. The recording could be made through the internal effect filter and could also record its own sequencer playing.

Interfaces 
The ASR-10 was available with a SCSI interface for connecting to an external hard drive, and CD-ROMs. It was noticeably more versatile than the EPS samplers, supporting a wider variety of hard drives, both fixed and removable, including Zip and SyQuest drives. The unit shipped as standard with a HD 3.5inch floppy drive internally.

Further upgrades were available with S/PDIF connectivity. There were not many S/PDIF boards made, however, and they are currently extremely rare.

SCSI compatibility 
Users purchasing SCSI devices for the ASR-10 should take care to verify compatibility; Ensoniq's SCSI implementation, while technically conformant, depends on the device supporting the low-level DISK FORMAT command, whereas many SCSI devices targeted at the IBM-PC market only supported the TRACK format commands, and such SCSI drives will not be usable by the ASR-10. The Syquest EZ-FLYER 230MB drive, for example, does work on the ASR-10, whereas the contemporary and more popular Iomega ZIP 100MB drives (save for some specially-flashed versions available by special request from the company during the 1990s) do not.

ASR-10s running the most recent OS version have no issues with Iomega Zip drives.

Disk drive 
The ASR-10 featured a 3.5 inch floppy disk drive used with proprietary formatted disks capable of holding up to 1640K. (The decision to go with a proprietary format was to get around the then-limitation of DOS filenames which were limited to 8 characters.) There are many computer programs that allow reading, writing, and formatting Ensoniq's disk and file system, among those made by Chicken Systems (Translator and Disk Tools), and a German programmer named Thoralt who created ensoniqfs, a filesystem plugin for Total Commander. Ensoniq's architecture allowed a sound to be loaded from floppy while the keyboard was operational.

Sound library 
Ensoniq had made sure that their samplers were immediately useful by providing a sound library with every device. These library disks gave musicians a taste of what was possible with the sample-engine and also the sequencer, acting as usable sounds right out-of-the-box, demonstration pieces for selling more, and tastes of what the extensive library could provide. The ASR-10 was also fully backwards compatible with the earlier Ensoniq EPS and EPS-16+ sound libraries. Ensoniq continued their practice of creating and commissioning sound libraries that real musicians used. Even today, new libraries continue to be made by third parties.

Famous users

References

External links
Ensoniq disk/file/conversion/building programs

Ensoniq ASR-10 operating system files and information

Ensoniq synthesizers
Samplers (musical instrument)
Polyphonic synthesizers